Haplogroup I-BY316, also known as I-Y7626 or I1a3a1a2a1b1 per the International Society of Genetic Genealogy ('ISOGG), is a Y chromosome haplogroup. It is correlated with a DYF406S1 value of 8 and a DYS617 value of 12.

I-BY316 may be classed as a Nordic haplogroup and it is most common in Finland. Its progenitor is assumed to have lived in Fenno-Scandinavia at around 300 BC.

Origins 
On the basis of analysing samples of volunteers in YDNA sequencing, the YDNA analysis company YFull estimated that I-BY316 formed 2,300 years ago (500 BC) (95 % CI 3,100 <-> 1,950 ybp) with a TMRCA (Time to Most Recent Common Ancestor) of 2,400 years (95 % CI 2,800 <-> 2,100 ybp) before present.

Geographically I-BY316 is believed to have arisen in or near what is now Finland (based in part on the current distribution of this haplogroup).The current distribution of I-BY316 shows that there is a very high concentration in the regions bordering the Baltic Sea. Due to the distinct distribution pattern around the Baltic sea it would appear that the progenitor of I-BY316 may have been immersed in a seafaring culture. In a historical context the distribution patterns fits well with the historical region of Kvenland and the associated tribe of the Kvens.  

At the time when haplogroup I-BY316 came into existence, the Celts were beginning to expand from their traditional territory in southern Germany. The Germanic peoples were then presumed to be occupying a possible original homeland in southern Sweden and the Jutland peninsula (i.e. the presumed homeland of parent haplogroup I-Z63). There were surrounded on three sides by Kvens. They appear to have gone through a period in which they were conquered by the western Celts and remained subject to them (especially in Jutland). Triggered by the Gallic invasion, the Germanic peoples began expanding south-westwards along the North Sea coast and eastwards along the shores of the Baltic Sea. The push eastward along the Baltic Sea deep into Kven territory is assumed to coincide with the migration pattern of I-BY316. Historical records from the time of haplogroup origin are extremely sparse. The mythological king Fornjót of the Orkneyinga saga was said to have ruled over Kvenland roughly around the time of haplogroup origin. Interestingly some academic sources transcribe the name Fornjót as "the old Jute" which is significant because of the suspected origin of parent haplogroup I-Z63 in Jutland. Fornjót was eventually followed by the dynasty of "sea kings" starting with Heiti Gorsson. Even though mythology may be very far removed from historical truth, it nevertheless paints a picture of a strong seafaring tradition in the area of interest and can therefore help to explain the subsequent expansion of the haplogroup.

Archeological Record 
I-BY316/I-Y7626 was found in a late 6th Century cemetery in Collegno, Italy, near the city of Torino.  The Collegno  burial site is associated with Gothic and Lombard remains and dated to the late 6th Century.  The remains of sample CL63 belong to subclade I-FT104588.  Sample CL63 was also remarkable from an autosomal point of view because CL63 was an individual of predominant central/northern ancestry who did not genetically belong to the major kindred unit. This discovery adds another historical connection of I-Z63 to the Gothic migrations of the early Medieval Period.

Another archeological sample is sample Zeytinliada 14832 which is possibly tied to the Kievan Rus. It belongs to an 25 to 35 year old adult who lived between 600 and 1000 CE during the Medieval Age and was found in the region now known as Zeytinliada, Erdek, Turkey. The genetic profile of this individual does not resemble northern Europeans, so he might be the descendant of a northern European (e.g. part of the Varangian guard of Byzantium) who intermarried with the local population, although a more proximal origin is also possible, as this lineage was found also in Langobards from Hungary. The Rus' provided the earliest members of the Varangian Guard. They were in Byzantine service from as early as 874.

Distribution 
Based on the public YDNA database FTDNA in December 2019 the I-BY316 haplogroup is showing the following distribution:

The breakdown by countries as above can be condensed into regions:

References 

Human Y-DNA haplogroups
Human evolution
Population genetics
Classical genetics